South West London may refer to several things related to London, England:

SW postcode area
South West (London sub region) (2008–2011), a regional planning designation
Western part of South London
South West (London Assembly constituency) (from 2000)
London South West (European Parliament constituency) (1979–1999)